Sandra Elena Roper (born c. December 29, 1956) is an American civil rights lawyer, who had an unsuccessful candidacy for district attorney in Brooklyn, New York against former King's County district attorney Charles J. Haynes, in 2001 before making a successful run for judge in 2017.  She is currently an active civil court judge in Kings County, New York. She has served in criminal court and civil court.

References
 Christopher Ketcham, "Meet the New Boss: Man vs. machine politics in Brooklyn". Harper's Magazine, December 2004, 45–56.

External links
Lawyer: Probe of Hynes's Opponent Aided, Not Ended, Her Political Activity
Campaign Tangle 6: Welcome To Brooklyn
 Meet The New Boss: Man vs. Machine Politics in Brooklyn

  Judicial Directory of New York

1955 births
Living people
Women in New York (state) politics
New York (state) lawyers
New York (state) state court judges
21st-century American women